Dehra Compass or Dehra Kompas is the location of a historical caravan campsite in Aksai Chin. It is under Chinese control and claimed by India. Historically, the camp was used by caravans journeying between the Indian subcontinent and Tarim Basin. It was traversed by European explorers during the 1800s. At one point, there were stone shelters constructed at this location to facilitate camping.

Etymology 
'Dehra' is derived from the Punjabi and Seraiki language word 'dera', meaning camp, while 'Compass' comes from the name of a survey officer, Kompas Walla.

Sino-Indian border dispute 
In the events leading to the Sino-Indian War, Indian patrols used Kompas La and Dehra Compass to monitor the area. Chinese troops gained control of this area after May 1961.

Kompas La 

Kompas La or Dehra La is the pass through a nearby mountain spur.

See also
 List of locations in Aksai Chin

Notes

References

Mountain passes of China
Mountain passes of Xinjiang
Areas occupied by China through the Sino-Indian War
Aksai Chin